Stenichneumon culpator is a species of ichneumon wasp in the family Ichneumonidae.

Subspecies
These three subspecies belong to the species Stenichneumon culpator:
 Stenichneumon culpator adsentator (Tischbein, 1881) c g
 Stenichneumon culpator cincticornis (Cresson, 1864) b
 Stenichneumon culpator culpator g
Data sources: i = ITIS, c = Catalogue of Life, g = GBIF, b = Bugguide.net

References

Further reading

External links

 

Ichneumoninae
Insects described in 1802